Carmen Guadalupe Fonz Sáenz (born 22 June 1954) is a Mexican politician affiliated with the PRI. As of 2013 she served as Senator of the LX and LXI Legislatures of the Mexican Congress representing Campeche  (as replacement of Fernando Ortega Bernés). She also served as federal deputy during the LIX Legislature and a local deputy in the LV Legislature of the Congress of Campeche.

References

1954 births
Living people
Politicians from Mexico City
Women members of the Senate of the Republic (Mexico)
Members of the Senate of the Republic (Mexico)
Members of the Chamber of Deputies (Mexico)
Institutional Revolutionary Party politicians
21st-century Mexican politicians
21st-century Mexican women politicians
Women members of the Chamber of Deputies (Mexico)
Members of the Congress of Campeche
20th-century Mexican politicians
20th-century Mexican women politicians